The 1969–70 Macedonian Republic League was the 26th since its establishment. FK Skopje back than MIK Skopje won  their 1st championship title.

Participating teams

Final table

External links
SportSport.ba
Football Federation of Macedonia 

Macedonian Football League seasons
Yugo
3